The following is a list of TV episodes and OVAs for the Japanese anime Black Jack produced by Tezuka Productions.  The OVAs were directed by Osamu Dezaki, while the television series episodes were directed by Makoto Tezuka and Satoshi Kuwabara respectively.

List of episodes

Black Jack OVA series (1993-2011)
The first ten Black Jack OVAs were first released between December 12, 1993 and July 25, 2000. Two further episodes were released on December 16, 2011, also referred to as Black Jack and Black Jack Final, based on storyboards and other production work left behind by Osamu Dezaki.

Black Jack: The Boy Who Came from the Sky (2000)

This OVA was a standalone 22-minute special installment produced as an exclusive supplement for the Black Jack Limited Edition Box gift set in March 22, 2000, the story was based faithfully on the chapter story from the manga titled "The Boy Who Came from the Sky".

Black Jack ONA series (2001-2002)

These online Flash animation stories of twelve episodes were each closely adapted from a single original manga chapter.  Two episodes have never been adapted in any other series: Titles and Carved Seal.

Black Jack TV specials (2003)
Four Black Jack specials titled The 4 Miracles of Life aired in 2003.

Black Jack TV series (2004-2006)
Black Jack TV first aired on October 11, 2004 and finished airing on March 6, 2006.

Black Jack 21 TV series (2006)
Black Jack 21 first aired on April 10, 2006 and finished airing on September 4, 2006.

References

Black Jack
Black Jack (manga)